The 1986–87 NC State Wolfpack men's basketball team represented North Carolina State University during the 1986–87 men's college basketball season. It was Jim Valvano's 7th season as head coach.

Roster

Schedule

|-
!colspan=12 style=| ACC Tournament

|-
!colspan=12 style=| NCAA Tournament

Rankings

References

NC State Wolfpack men's basketball seasons
Nc State
Nc State
NC State Wolfpack men's basketball
NC State Wolfpack men's basketball